Strathallan School is a private boarding and day school in Scotland for boys and girls aged 7–18. The school has a  campus at Forgandenny, a few miles south of Perth.

School roll
The school has 73 full-time staff, and 18 part-time staff. It has pupils as follows:

History
" Strathallan School, is a Scottish independent co-ed boarding and day school for pupils aged 8-18. Strathallan was founded by Harry Riley in 1913, whose philosophy was to offer a uniquely wide-ranging curriculum of "opportunities for all to excel". In 1920 the school then moved to its present-day campus in Forgandenny which spans 153 acres of rural Perthshire and promotes an all-round progressive education striving to maintain Riley's original significant values: Respect, Kindness, Humility, Honest, Hard Work and Excellence with to foster and nurture the best in every pupil.

At Strathallan, teaching is built around the individual, recognising that young people learn in different ways. This supportive approach helps to develop each pupil's needs and ambitions, encouraging pupils to achieve more.  The choice of study in sixth form offers A-Levels, Scottish Highers and the Extended Project Qualification and the pupils consistently achieve amongst the top exam results in the country, allowing them to take up places at top universities in the UK and abroad as well as pursuing further training and career pathways. Spanning professional, sports people and entrepreneurs, Strathallian alumni of note include: Duncan Scott (British Olympic swimmer), JJ Chalmers (ex Royal Marine, Invictus Games medallist and TV presenter) and Andrew Scott (Chief Executive, Orbital, structural engineers of the world's most powerful floating tidal turbine).

Strathallan's present Headmaster, Mark Lauder, advocates that every pupil's personal wellbeing can benefit from a wide cross-section of outdoor activities, building confidence, resilience and happiness. Strathallan's all-embracing community celebrates diversity together with achievements large and small, cultivating life-long friendships, curiosity and the love of learning. "

Headmasters
 Harry Riley FRSE (1913–1942)
 W. E. Ward (1942–1948)
 A. J. Shaw (Interim, 1948–1949)
 A. N. Hamilton (1949–1950)
 Wilfred Hoare (1951–1970)
 Duncan McCallum (1970–1975)
 David Pighills (1975–1993)
 Angus McPhail (1993–2000)
 Bruce Thompson (2000–2017)
 Mark Lauder (2017–present)

Controversy
In 2005, Strathallan was one of 50 independent schools in Britain found guilty of running a price-fixing cartel.
 
In 1998 a female teacher sued the school for discrimination alleging she had been sacked because she was unable to coach rugby at the mostly male school.
 
In 1995 two former pupils were found guilty and fined for drug possession after police had been called to the school in 1993 and found them in possession of cannabis resin. Charges against the pair relating to being involved in the supply of drugs at the school were dropped.

Academics
The curriculum is largely based on the English system, with some elements of the Scottish system. Most pupils study for GCSEs, although some study for Standard Grades in one or two subjects. Then, in their last two years, in sixth form, they study for either A-levels or Scottish Highers. 95% of pupils go to university, including a number to Oxford University, Cambridge University, and University of St Andrews. 82% of this year's A level entries were graded A*/Bgrades.

Sixth form subjects 
The school offers the following courses to Lower and Upper Sixth Form students:

Extracurricular activities
Pupils also participate in sport, drama, music, and other extracurricular activities. The school offers sports including rugby, cricket, field hockey, netball, football, athletics, squash, swimming, tennis, golf, badminton and skiing. Music also plays a vital role in the school, with many pupils playing in orchestras or ensembles such as a jazz band, pipe band or various choirs. A scholarship scheme is also available to talented pupils in a range of categories, including Academic, Art, Design Technology/Arkwright Scholarship, Music, Performing Arts, Piping, and Sports. The school organises regular drama productions and a significant number of pupils achieve London Academy of Music and Dramatic Art (LAMDA) awards. Pupils can also gain degrees from the London College of Music and Trinity College of Music through the school. Other activities include Combined Cadet Force (CCF) and the Duke of Edinburgh's Award Scheme. Strathallan is also notable as the only school in Scotland with a Royal Marine cadet Troop.

Boarding houses
The school has eight boarding houses in operation, including a Junior House for children from 7 to 13: Riley (mixed juniors), Freeland (boys), Nicol (boys), Ruthven (boys), Simpson (boys), Thornbank (girls), Woodlands (girls) and Glenbrae (girls). Riley has two separate wings for boys and girls.

Glenbrae was named after the school's original site in Bridge of Allan prior to 1920. A need for a new girls boarding house was realised several years back when both existing girls boarding houses reached capacity.

Leburn House (boys) existed until 1990.

Notable alumni
 
 Mike Allingham (born 1965), Scotland cricket international. 
 David Anderson (born 1937), former Vice-Chairman of the London Commodity Exchange.
 Sir George Baker (1910–1984), High Court Judge.
 Chris Baur (born 1942), Editor of The Scotsman (1985–1988).
 William Hugh Beeton (1903–1976), Chief Commissioner of Ashanti (1950–1954); Vice-President of The Royal African Society.
 Professor Alan Brash (born 1949), Professor of Pharmacology at Vanderbilt University.
 JJ Chalmers (born 1986), Scottish television presenter, public speaker and Invictus Games medallist. 
 John Cochrane (1930–2006), Concorde test pilot.
 Nicky Cochrane (born 1993), Scottish international field hockey player.
 Brigadier David Cranston (born 1945), British Army officer and businessman.
 Hamish Dawson (1927–2007), Scotland rugby union international. 
Dominik Diamond — Television Presenter
 Professor Alasdair Drysdale (born 1950), Professor Emeritus of Geography at the University of New Hampshire.
 Ronald Duncan (born 1962), British Olympic alpine skier.
 Tessa Dunlop (born 1974/5), television presenter and historian
 Matt Fagerson (born 16 July 1998 in Perth, Scotland), Scotland international rugby union player. 
 Zander Fagerson (born 19 January 1996), Scottish international rugby union player. 
 John Forrest (1917–1942), Scotland rugby union international.
 Bill Fraser (1908–1987), Laurence Olivier Award winning actor.
 Jim Gellatly (born 1968), radio presenter.
 Sir Ian Grant (1943–2022), former Chairman of the Crown Estate and Scottish Tourist Board.
 John Grant (1949–2020), multi-award-winning writer and editor.
 Professor Peter Grant (born 1944), former Regius Professor of Engineering at the University of Edinburgh; awarded 82nd Faraday Medal.
 John Malcolm Gray (1934–2009), Chairman of the Hongkong and Shanghai Banking Corporation (1993–96).
 Charlie Guest (born 30 December 1993), Scottish World Cup alpine ski racer. 
 Thomas Hart (1908–2001), Financial Secretary to Singapore; Scotland cricket and rugby union international.
 Chris Hartley (born 1982), Queensland Bulls and Australia A cricketer.
 Ashley Harvey-Walker (1944–1997), Warwickshire and Derbyshire county cricketer.
 Donny Hay (born 1959), Scotland field hockey international.
 Richard Henderson (born 1947), President of the Law Society of Scotland (2007–09).
 George Horne (born 12 May 1995), Scotland international rugby union player. 
 Air Chief Marshal Sir Angus Houston (born 1947), Royal Australian Air Force; former Chief of the Defence Force (2005–2011). 
 'Lord' Tim Hudson (1940–2019), DJ, voice actor and talent agent.
 Sir William Jardine, 13th Baronet (born 1984), 24th Chief of Clan Jardine.
 Robert Smith Johnston, Lord Kincraig (1918–2004), High Court Judge.
 Ian Jones (born 1941), co-founder and former Chairman of Quayle Munro merchant bank. 
 Archibald Angus Charles Kennedy, 8th Marquess of Ailsa, 19th Earl of Cassilis, 21st Lord Kennedy, 8th Baron Ailsa (1957–2015), known as Charles Cassilis when a pupil 
 Major General Lamont Kirkland (born 1958), British Army officer; former Commander 4th Infantry Division.
 Gilmour Leburn (1913–1963), MP Conservative, Kinross and West Perthshire (1955–1963); Under-Secretary of State for Scotland (1959–1963).
 Nicholas Lydon (born 1957), awarded the Lasker Clinical Award and Japan Prize for the development of Gleevec.
 Murray McCallum (born 16 March 1996), Scottish international rugby union player. 
 Barbie MacLaurin (born 1963), BAFTA nominated television producer and director.
 Ian MacNaughton (1925–2002), BAFTA winning television and film director, notably of Monty Python's Flying Circus.
 Professor Morris McInnes (1940–2020), Professor Emeritus of Accounting at the Sawyer Business School, Suffolk University, Boston, USA.
 Professor Hugh Miller (1939–2019), Professor Emeritus of Forestry at the University of Aberdeen; IUFRO Scientific Award.
 Doug Mitchell (born 1952), Academy Award nominated film producer for Babe.
 David Mitton (1939 – 2008), BAFTA nominated director and screenwriter, including Thomas the Tank Engine and Friends.
 Colin Montgomerie (born 1963), Scottish professional golfer; World golf hall of fame.
 Michael Moore (born 1965), MP Liberal Democrat, Berwickshire, Roxburgh and Selkirk (2005–2015); Secretary of State for Scotland (2010–2013).
 Peter Niven (born 1964), 1,000 race-winning National Hunt jockey and racehorse trainer.
 Robert Reid (born 1966), winner of the 2001 World Rally Driving Championship.
Jamie Ritchie (born 16 August 1996) Scotland international rugby union player.
 Air Commodore John Buchan Ross (1912–2009), Royal Air Force officer.
 Ninian Sanderson (1925–1985), winner of the 1956 24 Hours of Le Mans.
 Duncan Scott (swimmer) (born 6 May 1997) is a British swimmer representing Great Britain at the FINA World Aquatics Championships and the Olympic Games, and Scotland at the Commonwealth Games.
 Professor Sir John Shaw (1932–2021), Johnstone Smith Professor of Accountancy at the University of Glasgow; Governor Bank of Scotland (1999–2001).
 Professor John Sinclair (1935–2009), Emeritus Professor of Conveyancing at the University of Strathclyde.
 Iain Steel (born 1971), Malaysian professional golfer. 
 Struan Stevenson (born 1948), Conservative MEP.
 Gareth Trayner (born 1980), British Olympic alpine skier.
 Lawrence Urquhart (born 1935), former Chairman of Burmah Castrol, Scottish Widows and BAA Limited.
 Gavin Vernon (1926–2004), renowned for the Removal of the Stone of Scone in 1950.
 Eric McKellar Watt (1920–2001), founder of the 'McKellar Watt' meat pie company.
 Professor Nairn Wilson (born 1950), former Dean and Head of King's College London Dental Institute; numerous awards for dentistry.
 Michael Yellowlees (born 1960), Scotland field hockey international.

References

External links
School website
Strathallan School's page on Scottish Schools Online

Private schools in Perth and Kinross
Boarding schools in Perth and Kinross
Member schools of the Headmasters' and Headmistresses' Conference
Charities based in Scotland
Primary schools in Perth and Kinross
Secondary schools in Perth and Kinross
1913 establishments in Scotland
Educational institutions established in 1913